Lake Guntersville State Park is a public recreation area located on the far north side of the city of Guntersville in Marshall County, Alabama. The state park occupies  on the eastern shore of Guntersville Lake, a  impoundment of the Tennessee River. The park features resort facilities and is managed by the Alabama Department of Conservation and Natural Resources.

History
The state park had its beginnings in 1947, when the Tennessee Valley Authority transferred  on Guntersville Reservoir to the state to create what was first known as Little Mountain State Park. The park opened in 1974.

In 2011, the park suffered severe damage when it was struck twice during the tornado outbreak of April 27. Hundreds of trees in the northern half of the park were destroyed by an EF2 tornado that struck in the early morning. The campgrounds also saw damage done to RV campers and the camp lodge. A second tornado, rated EF1, followed shortly after the first, damaging the park entrance and golf course. Two years later, the campground officially reopened, following a rebuilding and upgrading of facilities and the planting of more than 400 new trees.

Awards 
In September 2020, Lake Guntersville State Park was one of eleven Alabama state parks awarded Tripadvisor’s Traveler’s Choice Award, which recognizes businesses and attractions that earn consistently high user reviews.

Activities and amenities
The park opened a zip lining course in 2016, later adding a Level 2 course in 2017.

References

External links

 Lake Guntersville State Park Alabama Department of Conservation and Natural Resources
 

State parks of Alabama
Protected areas of Marshall County, Alabama
Protected areas established in 1947
1947 establishments in Alabama
National Recreation Trails in Alabama